Best Friend Forgotten is a 2004 American documentary film about pet overpopulation. The documentary, hosted by David Duchovny (Californication, X-files), tells the stories of Oreo the cat and Clover the dog as they face the realities of pet overpopulation. Viewers are given a balanced look at the controversial practice of euthanasia and the alternative no-kill movement. Interviews discuss common myths about spaying and neutering, and leaders from government to animal rights groups discuss pet overpopulation and the impact on our society.

Creators
The documentary was written, directed, and produced by filmmaker Julie Lofton. In addition to a US theatrical run, the film aired nationally on PBS, was shown worldwide on TV, and is available in DVD. In 2005 Lofton won the prestigious Genesis Award for Best National PBS Documentary from the Humane Society of the United States, the largest animal protection organization in the US.

Following the film, Lofton was recruited by HSUS to spearhead the creation of their first TV/Film division: Animal Content in Entertainment (ACE), whose mission is to develop and support animal content in television and film. Each year ACE awards production grants to professional and student documentary filmmakers who highlight animal rights issues in short and feature-length films.

References

External links

 
 Best Friend Forgotten, HSUS feature article
 David Duchovny Hosts New Film About Abandoned Pets O'Bryanville Animal Rescue
  
 

2004 films
American documentary films
Documentary films about animal rights
2004 documentary films
Documentary films about urban animals
Pets in the United States
Films about pets
2000s English-language films
2000s American films